This is a list of universities in Burundi, as of October 2022. The list is not comprehensive.

Universities in Burundi
{| class="wikitable sortable"
|+ List of universities In Burundi
! Rank! !!Abbreviation!!Name of university !!Location!!Established
|-
| 1 
|UB ||University of Burundi ||Bujumbura ||1964
|-
| 2 
|UEA  ||Université Espoir d'Afrique ||Bujumbura ||2000
|-
| 3 
|ULBU ||Université Lumière de Bujumbura ||Bujumbura ||2000
|-
| 4 
| UNG || University of Ngozi ||Ngozi ||1999
|-
| 5 
|ENS  ||École Normale Supérieure de Bujumbura ||Bujumbura ||1965
|-
| 6 
|INSP  ||Institut National de Santé Publique (National Institute of Public Service) ||Bujumbura ||2022
|-
| 7 
|UGL  ||Université des Grands Lacs ||Bujumbura || 2000
|-
| 8
|ULT  || Université du Lac Tanganyika ||Bujumbura || 1999
|-
| 9
|EASU  || East Africa Star University ||Bujumbura || 2014
|-
| 10
|BIU  || Bujumbura International University ||Bujumbura ||2014
|-
| 11
|ISGE  || Institut Supérieur de Gestion des Entreprises||Bujumbura ||1987
|-
| 12
|UPG ||Université Polytechnique de Gitega||Gitega ||2013
|-
| 13
|UMLK ||Université Martin Luther King ||Bujumbura ||1999
|-
| 14
|IUEB ||International University of Equator, Burundi ||Bujumbura ||2016
|-
| 15
|UM ||Université de Mwaro ||Bujumbura ||2005
|-
| 16
|USA ||Université Sagesse d’Afrique ||Bujumbura ||2008
|-
| 17
|UPI ||	Université Polytechnique Intégrée ||Cibitoke ||2017
|-
| 18
|ILUB ||International Leadership University, Burundi ||Bujumbura || 2010
|-
| 19
|UCB ||Université Chrétienne de Bujumbura ||Bujumbura ||2015
|-
| 20
|UCB ||Université des Collines ||Bujumbura || 2009
|-
|21 
OUB ||Olivia University of Bujumbura  ||Bujumbura  || 2022

References

Burundi
Universities
Burundi